

This is a list of the National Register of Historic Places listings in Dukes County, Massachusetts.

This is intended to be a complete list of the properties and districts on the National Register of Historic Places in Dukes County, Massachusetts, United States. Latitude and longitude coordinates are provided for many National Register properties and districts; these locations may be seen together in a Google map.

There are 22 properties and districts listed on the National Register in the county, which include one National Historic Landmark and one National Historic Landmark District (Wesleyan Grove, which is listed twice in the register under different names).

Current listings

|}

See also
 
 List of National Historic Landmarks in Massachusetts
 National Register of Historic Places listings in Massachusetts

References

.
Dukes County, Massachusetts
Dukes